1968 is the seventh studio album by French singer France Gall, released in January 1968 on Philips Records. Released during the decline of the yé-yé era, the album features a psychedelic sound influenced by the Beatles' Revolver and Sgt. Pepper's Lonely Hearts Club Band.

Track listing

References

France Gall albums
Philips Records albums
1968 albums